Strizhi is a rural locality (a village) in Vereshchaginsky District, Perm Krai, Russia.  The population was 20 as of 2010.

Geography 
Strizhi is located 11 km east of Vereshchagino (the district's administrative centre) by road. Tyurikovo is the nearest rural locality.

References 

Rural localities in Vereshchaginsky District